State Route 310 (SR 310) is a  south–north state highway located in the southwestern part of the U.S. state of Georgia. It connects Reynoldsville with Colquitt.

Route description
SR 310 begins at an intersection with SR 253 east of Reynoldsville. The route heads due north to the town of Brinson. There, it intersects US 84/SR 38. After Brinson, the route curves northeast, and then northwest, to meet its northern terminus, an intersection with US 27/SR 1 in Colquitt. The roadway continues as SR 45 Connector (South 1st Street).

History

Considering that, only a year after the highway was commissioned, the Miller County section of the highway was decommissioned, leaving the Brinson section of SR 310 as a double spur in Decatur County, ending at the Miller County line to the north and Lake Seminole to the south with the other section of the highway across the lake. In 1965, a new route was constructed in Miller County, extending from the SR 310 stub end north to Colquitt. However, oddly enough, this road did not become part of SR 310 for more than two decades to come. In fact, the extension to Colquitt was not completed until the early 1990s. Perhaps the consideration of decommissioning the highway was so strong that no action was taken for all that time.

This all changed, however, in 1995. That year, the  dead end Yates Spring Road section south of SR 253 to Lake Seminole was decommissioned and the  portion of the highway on the other side of the lake was changed to SR 97 Spur.

The northern terminus of the highway was relocated within Colquitt to Grow Street instead of connecting to US 27 in downtown. That portion is now SR 45 Connector.

Major intersections

See also

References

External links

310
Transportation in Decatur County, Georgia
Transportation in Miller County, Georgia